The name Golden State Mutual Life Insurance Building has been assigned to two different buildings in Los Angeles, California.

Golden State Mutual Life Insurance Building (1928)
Golden State Mutual Life Insurance Building (1949)